Results and statistics for the 2004 Claxton Shield

Ladder

Championship series

23 January 2004 - Semi Final 1 - Western Australia Vs Queensland Rams

24 January 2004 - Semi Final 2 - South Australia Vs New South Wales Patriots

24 January 2004 - Grand Final - New South Wales Patriots Vs Queensland Rams
*Box Score

Award winners

Top Stats

All-Star Team

External links
 Official 2004 Claxton Shield Website

Claxton Shield
Claxton Shield
Claxton Shield
January 2004 sports events in Australia